African Jewish communities include:
Sephardi Jews and Mizrahi Jews who primarily live in the Maghreb of North Africa, including Morocco, Algeria, Libya, and Tunisia, as well as Sudan and Egypt. Some were established early in the diaspora; others after the expulsion from Iberia in the late 15th century.
South African Jews, who are mostly Ashkenazi Jews descended from post-Holocaust immigrant Lithuanian Jews.
Beta Israel living primarily in the Amhara and Tigray regions of Ethiopia and sparsely in Eritrea.
Berber Jews, the majority of whom were assimilated and converted to Islam, especially during the historical persecutions of the Almohadic Caliphate in the Middle Ages. The modern population of Berber Jews in Africa now numbers about 8,000 people in Morocco, with the majority having emigrated to Israel since the 1948 Arab-Israeli War, along with smaller numbers scattered throughout Europe and North America. 
Historical communities which no longer exist in Africa due to assimilation, such as the Jews of Bilad el-Sudan in West Africa, who existed before the introduction of Islam to the region during the 14th century. 
Various relatively modern groups throughout Africa, most of whom claim some form of a Judaic or Israelite identity, and/or ancestry.

Ancient communities

The most ancient communities of African Jews are the Ethiopian, West African Jews, Sephardi Jews, and Mizrahi Jews of North Africa and the Horn of Africa.

In the seventh century, many Spanish Jews fled from the persecution which was occurring under the rule of the Visigoths and migrated to North Africa, where they made their homes in the Byzantine-dominated cities along the Mediterranean coast. Others arrived after the expulsion from Iberia. Remnants of longstanding Jewish communities remain in Morocco, Tunisia, and the Spanish cities of Ceuta and Melilla. There is a much-diminished but still vibrant community on the island of Djerba in Tunisia. Since 1948 and the war to establish Israel, which aroused hostility in Muslim lands, most other North African Jews emigrated to Israel.

Of the seventh-century immigrants, some moved inland and proselytized among the Berber tribes. A number of tribes, including the Jarawa, Uled Jari, and some tribes of the Daggatun people, converted to Judaism. Ibn Khaldun reported that Kahina, a female Berber warlord who led the resistance against the Muslim Arab conquests of North Africa in the 680s and 690s, was a Jew of the Jarawa tribe. With the defeat of the Berber rebellion, none of the Jewish communities was initially forced to convert to Islam.

Ethiopia

In 1975, the Israeli religious authorities and government recognized the Beta Israel of Ethiopia as a legally Jewish community. Hundreds of persons who wanted to emigrate to Israel were air-lifted under the leadership of Prime Minister Menachem Begin. Begin had obtained an official ruling from the Israeli Sephardi Chief Rabbi (or Rishon LeTzion) Ovadia Yosef that the Beta Israel were descendants of the Ten Lost Tribes. Rabbis believed they were probably descendants of the Tribe of Dan; rabbinical responsa discussing issues related to the people date back hundreds of years. With this endorsement, in later decades tens of thousands of Beta Israel Jews were air-lifted to Israel. Significant immigration to Israel continues into the 21st century, producing an Ethiopian Jewish community of around 81,000 immigrants, who with their 39,000 children born in Israel itself, numbered around 120,000 by early 2009.

Due to certain aspects of Orthodox Jewish marital laws, Rabbi Yosef ruled that upon arrival in Israel, the Beta Israel had to undergo a pro forma conversion to Judaism. They had to declare their allegiance to a halachic way of life and the Jewish people, in conformity with practices followed by Orthodox Rabbinical Judaism. He did not demand the normal formal requirements that the halacha imposes on potential gentile proselytes, (such as a brit milah or immersion in a mikveh). Few Ashkenazi rabbinic authorities consider the conversions to be actual conversions, not pro forma.

Over time, due to their community's isolation from those in Europe and the Middle East, the practices of the Beta Israel developed to differ significantly from those of other forms of Judaism. In Ethiopia, the Beta Israel community was for the most part isolated from the Talmud. They did have their own oral law. In some cases, they had practices similar to those of Karaite Judaism, and in others more similar to rabbinical Judaism.

In many instances their religious elders, or priestly class, known as kessim or qessotch, interpreted the Biblical Law of the Tanakh in a way similar to the rabbinite Jewish communities in other parts of the world. In that sense, the Beta Israel had a tradition analogous to that of the Talmud, although at times at variance with the practices and teachings of other Jewish communities.

One significant difference is that the Beta Israel lacked the festivals of Purim and Hanukkah, probably because they branched off from the main body of Judaism before these non-Biblical holidays began to be commemorated. Today, most members of the Beta Israel community living in Israel do observe these holidays.

They are a community in transition. Some of the kessim accept the rabbinic/Talmudic tradition that is practiced by non-Ethiopian Orthodox Jews. Many of the younger generation of Ethiopian-Israelis have been educated in yeshivas and received rabbinical ordination (semikha). A certain segment of traditionalist kessim insist on maintaining their separate and distinct form of Judaism, as it had been practiced in Ethiopia and Eritrea. Many of the Ethiopian Jewish youth who have immigrated to Israel or been born there have assimilated either to the dominant form of Orthodox Judaism, or to a secular lifestyle.

The Beit Avraham of Ethiopia have some 50,000 members. This community also claims Jewish heritage. Several scholars think that they broke off from the Beta Israel community several centuries ago, hid their Jewish customs, and outwardly adopted Ethiopian Orthodox Christianity.

Beit Avraham have traditionally been on the lower rungs of Ethiopian social life. They have held occupations similar to those of the Beta Israel, such as crafts. Recently, the Beit Avraham community has attempted to reach out to the world Jewish community. They formed the Ethiopian North Shewa Zionist Organization in an attempt to save their Jewish identity. This group identifies as the Falashmura. As they do not have reliable proof of Jewish ancestry, Israeli religious authorities and other religious Jewish communities require them to complete a formal conversion to be recognized as Jews. Those who do so are considered converts.

Somalia

The Yibir are a tribe that lives in Somalia, eastern Ethiopia, Djibouti, and northern Kenya. Though they have been Muslim for centuries, some of them assert they are descendants of Hebrews who arrived in the Horn of Africa long before the arrival of Somali nomads. These individuals assert that Yibir means "Hebrew" in their language.

Outside the Yibir, there is essentially no known current or historic Jewish community in Somalia.

Bilad el-Sudan

The historical presence of Jewish communities in Africa is well-attested to. Today, the descendants of these Jews live in nations such as Sierra Leone, Liberia, Senegal, Ghana, Nigeria, and many other areas. According to the 17th century Tarikh al-Fattash and the Tarikh al-Sudan, several Jewish communities existed as parts of the Ghana, Mali, and later Songhai empires. One such community was formed by a group of Egyptian Jews, who allegedly traveled by way of the Sahel corridor through Chad into Mali. Manuscript C of the Tarikh al-Fattash described a community called the Bani Israel; in 1402, it lived in Tindirma, possessed 333 wells, and had seven princes as well as an army.

Another such community was that of the Zuwa ruler of Koukiya (located at the Niger River).  His name was known only as Zuwa Alyaman, meaning "He comes from Yemen". According to an isolated local legend, Zuwa Alyaman was a member of one of the Jewish communities transported from Yemen by Abyssinians in the 6th century CE after the defeat of Dhu Nuwas. Zuwa Alyaman was said to have traveled into West Africa along with his brother. They established a community in Kukiya at the banks of the Niger River downstream from Gao. According to the Tarikh al-Sudan, after Zuwa Alyaman, there were 14 Zuwa rulers of Gao before the rise of Islam in the second half of the eleventh century.

Other sources stated that other Jewish communities in the region developed from people who migrated from Morocco and Egypt; others later came from Portugal. Some communities were said to have been populated by certain Berber Jews, like a group of Tuareg known as Dawsahak or Iddao Ishaak ("children of Isaac"). They speak a language related to Songhai, live in Ménaka Region in northeastern Mali and were formerly herders for Tuareg nobles. In addition, some migrated into the area away from the Muslim rule of North Africa.

The well-known 16th Century geographer Leo Africanus - an Andalusian Berber convert to Christianity - mentions a mysterious small village of African Jews southwest of Timbuktu, who traded in exotic spices, weapons, and poisons.

Medieval arrivals

North Africa and the Maghreb

The largest influx of Jews to Africa came after the Spanish Inquisition after the Fall of Granada and the end of Islamic Spain. The mass exodus and expulsion of the Iberian Jews began in 1492, Sicilian Jews were affected soon afterwards. Many of these Sephardi Jews settled primarily in the Maghreb under Muslim and Ottoman patronage. Morocco, Tunisia, Libya and Algeria as well as Egypt became home to significant Jewish communities. These communities were later incorporated into the Ottoman millet system as Africanized Ottoman Jews, bound by the laws of the Talmud and Torah but with allegiance to the Caliph of Constantinople.

Tanzania

The Nyambo are a tribe that lives in Tanzania, northern Tanzania, and Southern Uganda as Ankole. Though they have been Christians for centuries, they assert they are descendants of Hebrews who arrived in the Horn of Africa long before the arrival of Somali nomads. Some say that Nyambo means "Hebrew" in their language.

Songhai
In the 14th century many Moors and Jews, fleeing persecution in Spain, migrated south to the Timbuktu area, at that time part of the Songhai Empire. Among them was the Kehath (Ka'ti) family, descended from Ismael Jan Kot Al-yahudi of Scheida, Morocco. Sons of this prominent family founded three villages that still exist near Timbuktu—Kirshamba, Haybomo, and Kongougara.  In 1492, Askia Muhammed came to power in the previously tolerant region of Timbuktu and decreed that Jews must convert to Islam or leave; Judaism became illegal in Songhai, as it did in Catholic Spain that same year. As the historian Leo Africanus wrote in 1526: "The king (Askia) is a declared enemy of the Jews. He will not allow any to live in the city. If he hears it said that a Berber merchant frequents them or does business with them, he confiscates his goods."

The Kehath family converted with the rest of the non-Muslim population.  The Cohens, descended from the Moroccan Islamicized Jewish trader El-Hadj Abd-al-Salam al Kuhin, arrived in the Timbuktu area in the 18th century, and the Abana family came in the first half of the 19th century. According to Prof. Michel Abitbol, at the Center for the Research of Moroccan Jewry in Israel, in the late 19th century Rabbi Mordoche Aby Serour traveled to Timbuktu several times as a not-too-successful trader in ostrich feathers and ivory. Ismael Diadie Haidara, a historian from Timbuktu, has found old Hebrew texts among the city's historical records. He has also researched his own past and discovered that he is descended from the Moroccan Jewish traders of the Abana family. As he interviewed elders in the villages of his relatives, he has discovered that knowledge of the family's Jewish identity has been preserved, in secret, out of fear of persecution.

São Tomé e Príncipe

King Manuel I of Portugal exiled about 2,000 Jewish children under the age of ten, to São Tomé and Príncipe around 1500. Most died, but in the early 17th century "the local bishop noted with disgust that there were still Jewish observances on the island and returned to Portugal because of his frustration with them." Although Jewish practices faded over subsequent centuries, there are people in São Tomé and Príncipe who are aware of partial descent from this population. Similarly, a number of Portuguese ethnic Jews were exiled to Sao Tome after forced conversions to Roman Catholicism. From São Tomé and by other means groups of Jews settled down the west coast of Africa, as far south as Loango.

Modern communities

Cameroon

Rabbi Yisrael Oriel, formerly Bodol Ngimbus-Ngimbus, was born into the Ba-Saa tribe. He says there were historically Jews in the area and that the word "Ba-Saa" is from the Hebrew for 'on a journey' and means "blessing".  Rabbi Oriel claims to be a Levite descended from Moses and reportedly made aliya in 1988, and he was then apparently ordained as a rabbi by the Sephardic Chief Rabbi and appointed rabbi to Nigerian Jews.

Rabbi Oriel claims that in 1920 there were 400,000 'Israelites' in Cameroon, but by 1962 the number had decreased to 167,000 due to conversions to Christianity and Islam.  He said that although these tribes had not been accepted halachically, he believes that he can prove their Jewish status from medieval rabbinic sources.

The father of Yaphet Kotto, an American actor, was a Cameroonian Jew. Kotto identified as Jewish.

Côte d'Ivoire

Communities have been forming in Côte d'Ivoire in recent years and have been slowly growing throughout the region. The capitol city of Abidjan has two synagogues, each with a population of about 40-70 congregants. In addition, large groups of indigenous peoples referred to as Danites claim descent from the lost tribe of Dan and many from this ethnic group have shown interest in Judaic practices.

Ghana

From the eighteenth century on what is now Ghana was a favorite locus for theories positing Israelite origins for various  ethnic groups in the area. These theories were widespread and were taken up by powerful people in the twentieth century. The House of Israel community of Sefwi Wiawso, Sefwi Sui has identified as Jewish since the early 1970s. The Ga-Dangme tribe in the southern Region of Ghana assert that their ancestors are descendants of the tribe Gad and Dan who migrated south through Egypt. They observe many Hebraic traditions such as circumcision of their male child;  they also cannot name their male child until he has been circumcised. They also have many ancient Jewish names that are traditional names.

Kenya

Theories suggesting Israelite origins particularly of the Masai abounded in the nineteenth century and were gradually absorbed into religious and societal practices throughout the area. The chief proponent of Masai Israelite origins was a German officer Moritz Merkel whose detailed research is still in use today.  Of the many Judaic manifestations in the religious sphere is a small emergent community  in Laikipia County, Kenya,  which has abandoned Christianity  and taken up Judaism. There are an estimated 5,000 of them at the present time. Although at first Messianic, they concluded that their beliefs were incompatible with Christianity and are now waiting to be instructed in traditional Judaism. Some of the younger children of this community have been sent to the Abayudaya schools in Uganda to be instructed in Judaism and other subjects. Luos in Kenya are  another of the groups considered by some to be  of Israelite origin. They claim to have migrated hundreds of years ago from the north  along  the river Nile from Egypt through South Sudan and then into Kenya.

Madagascar

In early modern times it was widely believed that  Israelites had settled in Madagascar. Works by the French scholar Alfred Grandidier and Augustus Keane, the British professor of Hindustani at University College, London provided what they saw as conclusive proof of  these ancient connections. These ideas were absorbed into the national consciousness of the people of Madagascar. In 2010 a small community of Malagasies began practicing normative Judaism, and three separate communities formed, each embracing a different  version of Jewish spiritual practice. In May 2016, 121 members of the Malagasy Jewish community were converted in accordance with traditional Jewish rituals; appearing before a beit din and submerged in a mikvah. The conversion, organized with the help of the Jewish organization Kulanu, was presided over by three Orthodox rabbis.

Nigeria

Since the eighteenth century, there have been claims which state that the Igbo are of Jewish origin. At the present time, the existence of Israelite associations is mainly attributed to the Igbo, many of whom claim Israelite origins. Most of the Jews of Nigeria can be found among the Igbo ethnic group. Certain Nigerian communities with Judaic practices have been receiving help from individual Israelis and American Jews who work in Nigeria with outreach organizations like Kulanu.
The number of Igbos in Nigeria who identify as Jews has been estimated to number around 4,000 (2016), along with 70 synagogues. Many have converted from Christianity. Other sources give a higher estimate, claiming that some 30,000 Igbos were practicing some form of Judaism in 2008.

South Africa

Uganda

For centuries, it was believed that Jews inhabited the central portions of Africa. Some Africans were keen to adopt Judaism in recent times. One of these was Samei Kakungulu, one of the most remarkable Ugandans of his generation, a brilliant military strategist and a man who had a great amount of spiritual and intellectual curiosity. In 1919, having declared that "we now will be known as Jews," he was circumcised along with his first son, whom he called  Yuda. His second son was subsequently circumcised on the eighth day, in the Jewish fashion, and he was named Nimrod. In 1922, Kakungulu published a 90-page book, which was essentially a guide to Judaism. He died a Jew (albeit one with a residual belief in Jesus) and his followers in Mbale, who are known as the Abayudaya, continued to practice Judaism, despite the persecution which they were subjected to during the rule of Idi Amin, when many of them converted to Christianity or Islam, and today, they are some thousand strong. In the twenty first century, the Abayudaya are considered observant practitioners of Judaism, many of them have undergone formal Orthodox conversions, and they have forged strong links with Jewish communities in the United States and Israel, along with increasingly strong links with Black Jewish communities in Africa and elsewhere. In a relatively new movement, the Abayudaya of Uganda have converted to Judaism since 1917, influenced by the American William Saunders Crowdy, who claimed that African Americans were descended from the Jews.

Zambia

A number of European Jews settled in Northern Rhodesia (now Zambia). At its peak in the early 1960s, there were 1,000 Jews living in the country, many in Livingstone. The number began to fall after independence and there were estimated to be around 50 remaining by 2012.

Zimbabwe

Anglo-Jews

The Zimbabwe Jewish Community was mainly of British citizenship, whose arrival coincides with the first white colonists in the 1890s. At its peak in the early 1970s, it numbered some 7,500 people (80% were of Ashkenazi descent), who lived primarily in the two communities of Salisbury and Bulawayo. Smaller rural communities also existed for short periods in Que Que, Umtali and Gatooma. The community declined in part due to age, but most Jewish residents in Zimbabwe left after violence and social disruption. In 2007, the local Jewish community had declined to 270. The community had strong links with Israel. In 2003, the Bulawayo Shul was burnt down in an anti-Semitic act of violence.

The Lemba People

The Lemba,"wa-Remba", or "Mwenye" are a Bantu-speaking ethnic group which is native to Zimbabwe and South Africa, with smaller, little-known branches in Mozambique and Malawi. According to Tudor Parfitt, when he first worked in the field among the Lemba in South Africa, Zimbabwe and Malawi in the 1980s, they numbered an estimated 50,000. They speak the same Bantu languages which their geographic neighbours speak and they also bare a physical resemblance to their geographic neighbors, but some of their religious practices and beliefs are similar to Jewish and Islamic practices and beliefs. According to Parfitt, the Lemba claim that they once had a book which described their traditions but it was lost.

Parfitt has suggested that the name "Lemba" may originate in chilemba, a Swahili word for the turbans which are worn by some Bantu men, or it may originate from lembi, a Bantu term for a "non-African" or a "respected foreigner". Magdel le Roux says that the name VaRemba may be translated as "the people who refuse" – probably in the context of "not eating with others" (according to one of her interviewees). In Zimbabwe and South Africa, the people prefer the name Mwenye.

They have a tradition of ancient Jewish or South Arabian descent through their male line. Genetic Y-DNA analyses in the 2000s have established a partially Middle-Eastern origin for a portion of the male Lemba population. More recent research argues that DNA studies do not support claims of a specifically Jewish genetic heritage.

Mauritius

According to the 2011 census carried out by Statistics Mauritius, there are 43 Jews in Mauritius.

See also

African American–Jewish relations
African-American Jews
Black Hebrew Israelites, groups of African Americans who believe that they are the descendants of the ancient Israelites
Genetic studies on Jews
Groups claiming affiliation with Israelites
History of the Jews under Muslim rule
Jewish diaspora
Jewish ethnic divisions
Jewish history
Madagascar plan, a plan to forcibly relocate the Jewish population of Europe to the island of Madagascar which was proposed by the Nazi German government
Who is a Jew?
British Uganda Program, a British plan to create a Jewish homeland in East Africa
List of Jews from Sub-Saharan Africa
Moroccan citron
Lemba people, an ethnic group in Southern Africa which claims Israelite descent

Notes and references

Further reading

General
 Blady, Ken: Jewish Communities in Exotic Places, Jerusalem, Jason Aronson.
 Bruder, Édith: Black Jews of Africa, Oxford 2008.
 Kurinsky, Samuel: Jews in Africa: Ancient Black African Relations, Fact Paper 19-II.
 Dierk Lange: "Origin of the Yoruba and the "Lost Tribes of Israel",  Anthropos, 106, 2011, 579–595.
 Parfitt, Tudor (2002) The Lost Tribes of Israel: the History of a Myth. London: Weidenfeld and Nicolson.
 Parfitt, Tudor (2013) Black Jews in Africa and the Americas, Harvard University Press. 
 Parfitt, Tudor (2020) Hybrid Hate: Conflations of Anti-Black Racism and Anti-Semitism from the Renaissance to the Third Reich. New York: Oxford University Press.
 Parfitt, Tudor and Egorova, Y. (2005) Genetics, Mass Media, and Identity: A Case Study of the Genetic Research on the Lemba and Bene Israel. London: Routledge.
 Rosenthal, Monroe and Isaac Mozeson: Wars of the Jews: A Military History from Biblical to Modern Times, New York, Hipporcrene Books, 1990.
 Sand, Jay: "The Jews of Africa", Image Magazine, 5 May 2009
 Williams, Joseph J.: Hebrewisms of West Africa: From Nile to Niger With the Jews, Ney York, The Dial Press, 1931.
 History of the Zimbabwe Jewish Community

Northern Africa
Israel, Jonathan I. "The Jews of Spanish North Africa (1580–1669)" in Diasporas within a Diaspora: Jews, Crypto-Jews, and the World of Maritime Empires (1540–1740). Leiden: Brill 2002, pp. 151–184.
Israel, Jonathan I. "Piracy, Trade and Religion: The Jewish Role in the Rise of the Muslim Corsair Republic of Saleh (1624–1666)" in Diasporas within a Diaspora: Jews, Crypto-Jews, and the World of Maritime Empires (1540–1740). Leiden: Brill 2002, pp. 291–312.
Israel, Jonathan I. "Tangiers, Sephardic Jewry and English Imperial Ambitions in the Maghreb (1661–1684)" in Diasporas within a Diaspora: Jews, Crypto-Jews, and the World of Maritime Empires (1540–1740). Leiden: Brill 2002, pp. 421–448.
Jews in Africa: Part 1 The Berbers and the Jews, by Sam Timinsky (Hebrew History Federation)
Tarikh es Soudan, Paris, 1900, by Abderrahman ben-Abdall es-Sadi (trad. O. Houdas)
The Jews of Timbuktu, Washington Jewish Week, 30 December 1999, by Rick Gold
Les Juifs à Tombouctou, or Jews of Timbuktu, Recueil de sources écrites relatives au commerce juif à Tombouctou au XIXe siècle, Editions Donniya, Bamako, 1999 by Professor Ismael Diadie Haidara

West Africa
Mark, Peter and José da Silva Horta, The Forgotten Diaspora: Jewish Communities in West Africa and the Making of the Atlantic World. Cambridge: Cambridge University Press 2011.
Joseph Eidelberg "Bambara (A PROTO-HEBREW LANGUAGE?)" https://josepheidelberg.com/blog/

Nigeria
Remy Ilona: Igbos, Jews in Africa?, (Volume 1), Mega Press Limited, Abuja, Nigeria, 2004.
Charles K. Meek: Northern Tribes of Nigeria, Volume 1, Oxford, p. 66.
 Kannan K. Nair: Origins and Development of Efik Settlements in Southeastern Nigeria.  1Ohio University, Center for International, 1975.
Eze Okafor-Ogbaji: Jews of Nigeria: The Aro Empire,

Ethiopia
Stigma "Gojjam": The Abyssinian Pariah Orits, Guihon Books, University of Geneva, 1993, by Muse Tegegne

External links
 Gorin, Howard (Rabbi): Site about travels Amongst Nigeria's and Uganda's Jews
 Maddy-Weitzman, Bruce: Jews and Berbers,
 Sand, Jay: Site about African Jews
ISSAJ – International Society for the Study of African Jewry
Scattered Among The Nations
The Awakening & In-Gathering of The Ibos
History of the Jewish community in Ghana
Shabbat in Ghana